The men's 10 metre platform, also reported as platform diving, was one of four diving events on the Diving at the 1972 Summer Olympics programme.

The competition was split into two phases:

Preliminary round (3 September)
Divers performed seven dives. The twelve divers with the highest scores advanced to the final.
Final (4 September)
Divers performed three voluntary dives without limit of degrees of difficulty. The final ranking was determined by the combined score with the preliminary round.

Results

References

Sources
 

Men
1972
Men's events at the 1972 Summer Olympics